The Day of Ukrainian Literature and Language is a holiday of the development of the State Language, which is celebrated every year in Ukraine on November 9.

According to the Julian calendar, it is a day honoring the memory of the Nestor the Chronicler, a follower of the creators of Cyrillic script, Cyril and Methodius.

History 
The holiday began on November 9, 1997, when the President of Ukraine Leonid Kuchma issued a Decree No. 1241/97 "On the Day of Ukrainian Literature and Language" in support of the initiative of public organizations and taking into account the important role of the Ukrainian language in consolidating Ukrainian society.

Features of the celebration 
On the Day of Ukrainian Literature and Language, according to tradition:

 lay flowers at the monument to Nestor the Chronicler;
 celebrate the best popularizers of the Ukrainian word;
 encourage publishing houses that publish literature in the Ukrainian language;
 The Petro Jacyk International Competition of Ukrainian Language Experts is held with the support of the Ministry of Education and Science of Ukraine and the League of Ukrainian Patrons. The annual number of participants is over 5 million from 20 countries.

There was also a tradition on November 9, when parents took their children to school and then went to church: to place a candle in front of the image of Nestor the Chronicler and pray that he would help the child with his studies.

On the Day of Ukrainian Literature and Language, the Ukrainian Radio traditionally hosts a radio dictation of national unity. This campaign was launched in 2000. Since then, every year everyone can take part in writing a radio dictation and not so much to find out whether they know the Ukrainian language well, but to demonstrate unity with all those who love and respect the Ukrainian word.

Features of the celebration in 2010 
In 2010, the Minister of Education and Science, a representative of the Party of Regions Dmytro Tabachnyk announced the refusal of the Ministry of Education and Science of Ukraine to finance the International Competition of Ukrainian language experts. Petra Jacika. The competition was held without the participation of the Ministry of Education and Science of Ukraine.

A protest action "Do business, not language!" Took place in Kyiv directed against the bill "On Languages" No. 1015-3, which significantly narrows the scope of the Ukrainian language. About 500 people took part in the event dedicated to the Day of Ukrainian Literature and Language on Bankova Street near the Presidential Administration. Among them are students and teachers of the National Technical University of Ukraine "Kyiv Polytechnic Institute", Kyiv National Taras Shevchenko University and the National University "Kyiv-Mohyla Academy". The action was also joined by an elderly man with a poster "The worst rulers in the history of Ukraine: Lenin. Stalin, Yanukovych ". Protesting against the Law of Ukraine "On Languages" No. 1015-3, the audience chanted "Do business, not language!". The presidential administration sent congratulations to the protesters from the head of state. However, according to protesters, Viktor Yanukovych has nothing to do with his writing. After that, an inflatable ball with a diameter of about one meter with the inscription "Law on Languages" was pierced, which was supposed to symbolize the prevention of its adoption. From Bankova, the protesters marched to Independence Square, shouting "Glory to the Nation", "Death to the Enemies", "Ukraine is a Nation", "Ukraine Above All!", "Kyiv is a Ukrainian City", "We Love the Ukrainian Language", "One". the state is one language "," Get rid of the law on languages "," In the native country - the native language "," Ukrainian language - to live ". On the main street of the country from about 600 candles the call "Feel the taste of the Ukrainian language" was laid out.

See also 

 International Mother Language Day
 European Day of Languages

References

External links 

 Українська мова — твого життя основа / ВІДЕО добірка плакатів до Дня української писемності та мови
 Тиндик, Т. Як парость виноградної лози…: 9 листопада — День української писемності та мови / Тетяна Тиндик // Гуцульський Край. — 2015. — No. 45 (5 лист.).
 UA DAY-2012 Спільнота — інтернет-акція, присвячена українській мові // Фейсбук-сторінка.
 Указ Президента України від 2007 року No. 1086 «Про відзначення державними нагородами України з нагоди Дня української писемності та мови»
 Програма «Слово». Випуск від 26.01.13 // Неофіційний блоґ із записами програми «Слово».
 Українська мова // Твіттер-бот.
 Інформаційно-довідковий портал «СловоUA»  — не діє.
 Словникова основа нашої мови. До Дня української писемності та мови // Дати і події, 2016, друге півріччя : календар знамен. дат No. 2 (8) / Нац. парлам. б-ка України. — Київ, 2016. — С. 114–117.

November observances
Ukrainian language
Public holidays in Ukraine